Bath Corner is an unincorporated community and census-designated place in Brown County, South Dakota, United States. As of the 2020 census, it had a population of 51.

Demographics

References

Census-designated places in South Dakota
Unincorporated communities in Brown County, South Dakota
Unincorporated communities in South Dakota
Aberdeen, South Dakota micropolitan area